The Dutch 1 guilder coin featuring Queen Beatrix on its obverse was a unit of currency of the Dutch guilder minted between 1982 and 2001.

It remained in use until the adoption of the euro in 2002. Its nominal value was ƒ 1,- (€0.45).

Coins of the Netherlands
One-base-unit coins